Thomas Barbour Bryan (December 22, 1828 – January 26, 1906) was an American businessman, lawyer, and politician.

Born in Virginia, a member of the prestigious Barbour family on his mother's side, Bryan largely made a name for himself in Chicago, Illinois. Bryan was involved in many ventures in the city, such as the creation of Graceland Cemetery, and was active in the city's politics, having twice been nominated for mayor. Bryan was a strong unionist during the American Civil War. Bryan was instrumental in Chicago being awarded the World's Columbian Exposition, and was involved in the exposition's organization and operation.

Bryan also played a key role in the development of the Chicago suburb of Elmhurst, Illinois, where he resided much of his life. He is often referred to as "The Father of Elmhurst".

In addition to his involvement in Chicago politics, Bryan spent a brief period as a commissioner of the District of Columbia.

Early life, education, and family
Bryan was born in Alexandria, Virginia, on December 22, 1828. His father was Daniel Bryan, and his mother was Mary Thomas Barbour Bryan. Bryan's father was a poet and a lawyer, abolitionist, and statesman who served from 1821 to 1853 as Alexandria's postmaster, and who, from 1818 through 1820 served in the Senate of Virginia.

A member of the esteemed Barbour family through his mother, Bryan's maternal uncles were James Barbour and Philip P. Barbour. His maternal grandfather was Thomas Barbour. One of Bryan's nephews would be Bryan Lathrop, with whom he would later form a personal and business relationship. Another nephew was Barbour Lathrop, and a niece was Florence Lathrop Field Page.

Sources disagree as to whether Bryan's paternal great-uncle was Daniel Boone, as it is unclear whether his father was Boone's nephew. If he is Boone's great-nephew, his paternal grandfather would have been William Bryan, one of the founders of Bryan Station, and his maternal grandmother had been Mary Boone Bryan.

Bryan was educated at Virginia's top preparatory schools.

For four years, Bryan held a clerkship with the post office that his father oversaw. The clerkship paid $300 annually, which Bryan saved up before leaving to attend Harvard University.

Bryan graduated from Harvard Law School in 1848. While attending Harvard, he lived in nearby Boston at the house of a German woman who taught him the German language. He would, soon after graduating, publish grammar meant to help Germans learn to read, write, and speak the English language. This grammar received praise from German press and from professors.

Adult life and career
After graduating from Harvard Law School, Bryan practiced law in Cincinnati until 1852. At one point in his legal career, he was attorney for the estate of deceased president William Henry Harrison.

In 1850, in a wedding ceremony held in Newport, Kentucky, Bryan married Jennie "Jane" Byrd Page who became Mrs. Jennie Byrd Bryan. His wife was related, by marriage, to the prominent Page and Lee families of Virginia. She was the daughter of an episcopal clergyman.

In 1852, Bryan and his wife moved to Chicago, where he had acquired broad real estate interests. Over the next half-century, Bryan would be a booster in the growth of the city.

Bryan's initial residence in Chicago was at 103 Michigan Avenue, near Madison Street. This was, at the time, a fashionable neighborhood. Here, he was neighbors with many prominent Chicagoans, including Matthew Laflin. Shortly after living here, he built a house at the northwest corner of Wabash Avenue and Jackson Street.

Sometime between 1856 and 1859, Bryan settled in Cottage Hill, Illinois (modern-day Elmhurst), building a 1,000-acre estate there named "Byrd's Nest". Bryan would ultimately play an important role in the development of the town, even being credited as the one responsible for renaming the town. He is often referred to as "The Father of Elmhurst". Living there, he would commute daily to Chicago on the Chicago and North Western Railway. In the 1860 United States census, Bryan was recorded to be the wealthiest person in DuPage County, with a net worth said to exceed $325,000. In 1864, he would sell 26 acres of his land to his brother-in-law, Jedediah Lathrop, who built his own estate named Huntington on the site.

Bryan and his wife Jennie had three children, two of whom (a son and a daughter) would live to adulthood. The son they lost as a child, Daniel Page Bryan, died on April 12, 1855. Their adult son was Charles Page Bryan, born in 1855, who would have a career as a lawyer, politician, and diplomat. Their daughter, born in 1857, was also named Jennie Byrd Bryan. She would become an artist and philanthropist, and would, in 1913, marry John Barton Payne, adopting his surname.

In 1860, Bryan established Graceland Cemetery in partnership with William Butler Ogden, Sidney Sawyer, Edwin H. Sheldon, and George Peter Alexander Healy. He was the inaugural president of the Graceland Cemetery Association. The first burial at the cemetery was Bryan's late son Daniel Page Bryan, with his remains having been disinterred and removed from the city cemetery in Lincoln Park along with approximately 2,000 other individuals. That year also saw the opening of Bryan Hall, a music hall which Bryan constructed in Chicago on Clark Street across from the city's courthouse. With a capacity of between 500 and 600 people, it was reported to be the largest hall of its kind in the metropolitan area at the time of its opening. It would remain the city's primary venue until the opening of Crosby's Opera House.

Bryan established a reputation for himself as a gifted orator.

Bryan was, twice, reluctantly a nominee for mayor of Chicago. In 1861, Bryan was the People's Ticket nominee for mayor of Chicago. He lost the election to Republican Julian Sidney Rumsey by a sizable margin. Bryan had been drafted for mayor by a number of acquaintances to run on what the being dubbed "The People's Ticket". Unaware at the time that he'd be running in opposition to the Republican Party, Bryan reluctantly accepted. He was reported to, ultimately, have seemed somewhat relieved by his ultimate defeat in the polls. He did not desire to be mayor of the city, nor did he want to cause disarray or fractures in the Republican Party at the time that the Civil War was beginning. Bryan was the National Union (Republican) nominee for the office in 1863, losing by an incredibly narrow margin to incumbent mayor Francis Cornwall Sherman. He originally planned to contest the result over allegations of election fraud by the Democrats, but ultimately did not, not being concerned enough with the results, having been a reluctant candidate to begin with.

A strong unionist, during the American Civil War, Bryan funded a company of the 105th Infantry Regiment of Illinois Volunteers in the Civil War, named the "Bryan's Blues". He was a member of the Union Defense Committee. He was also president of the Northwestern Sanitary Fair, an event held in 1865 along the Chicago lakefront which raised more than $300,000 for Union soldiers. Interestingly, his wife had incidentally been in the company of Confederate Army general Robert E. Lee, a relative of hers by marriage, just days before the breakout of the Civil War.

Bryan served in leadership roles for numerous Chicago organizations. From 1865 until 1906, Bryan served as president of the Chicago Soldiers' Home, which he also had helped to found. He was president of the Union League Club of Chicago.

In 1870, Bryan leased Bryan Hall to Richard M. Hooley for a period of five years, for $21,000 per year. It was renamed the Hooley Opera House.

In 1871, Bryan and his wife Jennie gave 30 acres of land to the German Evangelical Synod of the Northwest for a seminary, which would eventually become Elmhurst University.

In the Great Chicago Fire of 1871, Bryan lost $2 million, with one significant part of this being the loss of his music hall in the fire. After the fire, he provided a number of people displaced with refuge at Byrd's Nest. Bryan was involved in helping revive the city after the fire. Shortly before the fire Bryan had founded the Federal Savings Bank and Safe Depository, also known as the Fidelity Safe Depository. Despite the burning of its building, the vaults and safes were intact, and their contents survived the fire. Bryan rebuilt a new structure for the institution quickly after the fire. He purchased the metal from the Chicago Court House Bell which he used to fashion an alarm for his company, selling the rest to H.S. Everhart & Company which commissioned the U.S. Mint to strike commemorative medals from the metal.

From December 3, 1877, through July 1, 1878, Bryan served as Commissioner of the District of Columbia. During this brief period, he and his wife briefly lived in Washington, D.C.

In 1878, Bryan stepped-down as president of Graceland Cemetery, turning over the presidency to his nephew Bryan Lathrop.

For a period of time, he and his wife moved to Colorado. At the time of the 1880 United States census, he was recorded as residing in Clear Creek County, Colorado.

Bryan fell victim to what ultimately turned out to be a scam run by H. H. Holmes, a man who was later discovered to be a serial killer. He lost more than $9,000 after becoming involved in Holmes's scam "A.B.C. Copier Company" at the advice of Bryan's associate Fred Nind. Holmes would fraudulently use Bryan's name on the papers of this and a number of other scam companies.

Bryan was a leading figure in the effort to bring the World's Columbian Exposition to Chicago. Bryan convinced the Chicago City Council to pass legislation that would help the city in its efforts secure the world's fair. In 1890, he, alongside Chicago mayor DeWitt Clinton Cregier and former Illinois Central Railroad president Edward Turner Jeffery, gave the presentation for Chicago's bid to the fifteen member United States Senate committee that decided what location would be awarded the fair. Bryan's remarks were perhaps the most persuasive of the three speaking on behalf of the city. In his remarks Bryan, in part, retorted the hyperbolic and critical remarks about Chicago that had been issued by Chauncey Depew (who was representing New York City's interest in receiving the fair).

After Chicago landed the fair, Bryan was appointed a commissioner-at-large of the World's Columbian Exposition Board created by federal legislation. He was ultimately the vice president of the World's Columbian Exposition, vice president of the World's Congress Auxiliary, Commissioner General of the Exposition and the Chairman of the Congresses Committee of Organization, and President of the World's Congress. Bryan worked successfully to convince the Chicago City Council, Illinois General Assembly and United States legislature to pass legislation providing assistance to the fair's organizers. In his travels through Europe promoting the exposition, he met with many ruling monarchs and Pope Leo XIII. During the exposition, he personally hosted many of the dignitaries and royals that attended the fair at his Byrd's Nest estate.

Later years and death

Bryan was widowed on March 5, 1898, when his wife of 48 years, Jennie, died at the age of 68 at their Byrd's Nest estate of paralysis that had impacted her brain and vocal organs, before reaching her heart. She had only developed the paralysis days earlier on March 3.

Bryan spent his last decade splitting time between Byrd's Nest and living out east, in Virginia and Washington, D.C.
Bryan died January 26, 1906, in Washington, D.C.

Bryan is buried at Oak Hill Cemetery in Washington, D.C., where the Bryan family had a burying ground. His wife Jennie had been buried at Oak Hill Cemetery after her 1898 death. His son Charles would be buried in the cemetery after his death in 1918, as would his daughter Jennie after her death in 1919 and his son-in-law John Barton Payne after his death in 1935.

Art collection and patronage of George Peter Alexander Healy
Bryan commissioned many works by George Peter Alexander Healy. Healy was acquainted with Bryan. In 1857, Healy purchased a cottage in Cottage Hill (Elmhurst) from Bryan, where Healy lived for next six years, making him neighbors with Bryan during this period. Healy also partnered with Bryan in the founding of Graceland Cemetery In addition, Bryan's daughter Jennie would become a student of Healy's. One day in 1860, Bryan purchased all the paintings Healy's entire painting gallery to display in a hall he owned on Dearborn Street.

In his art collection were portraits which Henry Clay, Edward Everett, Henry Wadsworth Longfellow, Daniel Webster had posed for.

Bryan owned a collection of paintings of all presidents of the United States. Many of these were painted by Healy. Bryan gave this collection to the Corcoran Gallery of Art.

After Bryan's death, many of the paintings of Healy's he still owned were passed on to his daughter Jennie. After her death in 1919, in 1920, Jennie Byrd's Payne's widowed husband, John Barton Payne, gave a collection of forty masterpieces to the State of Virginia, a gift valued at time at over $1 million. In this gift were several paintings Bryan commissioned from Healy. This gift, which was given by Payne alongside a financial gift of $100,000 for a museum to house the art, came with a stipulation that the state must match his gift. This was eventually done in 1932, and construction began on the Virginia Museum of Fine Arts.

Collector of historic memorabilia
In his life, Bryan acquired several noteworthy pieces of historic memorabilia.

After the Great Chicago Fire, Bryan purchased the broken remains of the bell from the city's lost courthouse at an auction. He kept parts of the bell, but sold most of the bell's remains to H.S. Everhart & Company, who made one-inch tall miniature bells as souvenirs. The courthouse bell was notable in relation to the fire, as it had been one of the bells in the city that was rung to warn citizens of the fire.

After notable people had been invited to send items to the Northwestern Sanitary Fair to auction, Abraham Lincoln sent the original draft of the Emancipation Proclamation. Bryan was successful in bidding for it, paying $3,000 for it, the item being the highest bid item on auction. Bryan had lithographic copies made and sold for the benefit of the Sanitary Commission. Bryan gifted the document to the Chicago Soldier's Home, who in turn entrusted it to the Chicago Historical Society for safekeeping. However, this original document was lost in the Great Chicago Fire.

Electoral history

References

1828 births
1906 deaths
Illinois Democrats
Illinois Republicans
People from Elmhurst, Illinois
Politicians from Chicago
Illinois lawyers
Lawyers from Cincinnati
Barbour family
Washington, D.C., Republicans
People of Illinois in the American Civil War
Members of the Board of Commissioners for the District of Columbia
World's Columbian Exposition
Burials at Oak Hill Cemetery (Washington, D.C.)
Politicians from Alexandria, Virginia
Lawyers from Alexandria, Virginia
Businesspeople from Alexandria, Virginia
Harvard Law School alumni
Politicians from Washington, D.C.
Colorado lawyers
Colorado Republicans
Businesspeople from Colorado